A shoulder angel is a plot device used for dramatic and/or humorous effect in fiction, mainly in animation and comic books/strips. The angel represents conscience and is often accompanied by a shoulder devil representing temptation. They are a useful convention for depicting the inner conflict of a character.

Iconography 
The shoulder angel often uses the iconography of a traditional angel, with wings, a robe, a halo, and sometimes a harp. The shoulder devil likewise usually looks like a traditional devil with reddish skin, horns, barbed tail, a trident and in some cases, cloven hooves.  Often, both resemble their host, though sometimes they will resemble other characters in the story who are responsible or mischievous. In Western culture the idea develops the Christian concept of a personal guardian angel, who was sometimes considered to be matched by a personal devil who countered the angel's efforts, especially in popular medieval dramas like the 15th century The Castle of Perseverance. In both this and Christopher Marlowe's  play The Tragical History of Doctor Faustus, of about 1592, the "Good Angel" and "Bad Angel" offer competing advice (Act 2, scene 1, etc.) to the hero.

Origins 

The non-canonical early Christian book The Shepherd of Hermas, of around A.D. 140–150, has a reference to the idea of two angels: "There are two angels with a man—one of righteousness, and the other of iniquity". These angels in turn descend into a person's heart, and attempt to guide a person's emotions. Hermas is told to understand both angels, but to only trust the Angel of Righteousness. The concept is similar to ideas of personal tutelary spirits that are very common in many ancient and traditional cultures.

In some Christian folklore, each person has a dedicated guardian angel whose task is to follow the person and try to prevent them from coming to harm, both physical and moral.  At the same time each person is assailed by devils, not usually considered as single and dedicated to a single person in the same way as the guardian angel, who try to tempt the person into sin.  Both angels and devils are often regarded as having the ability to access the person's thoughts, and introduce ideas.

Similar beliefs 
There is a similar Islamic belief of Kiraman Katibin, two angels residing on either shoulder of humans which record their good and bad deeds.  However, these angels do not have influence over the choices one makes, and only record one's deeds. However, there is a concept much more similar to the shoulder angel and devil: the qareen, which, according to Islamic literature, is a personal companion, and there are two with each individual, one from the angels and another from the jinn. The word qarīn literally means 'constant companion'. The angel pushes the individual to do good and obey God while that from the jinn does the opposite.

In Japanese Buddhism, the Kushoujin are a pair of beings –  and  – which sit on a person's shoulders, observing and reporting all his deeds. Dōmyō records good deeds, but Dōshō reports bad ones.

In Ancient Greek philosophy, Plato writes in Phaedrus about a speech given by Socrates that splits the soul into three parts: a "charioteer," or the man that participates in everyday life, a "good horse" that knows of self-control, moderation, and shame, and a "bad [horse]" who "does everything to aggravate its yokemate and its charioteer." The bad horse, who "barely yields to horsewhip and goad combined," tempts the charioteer in matters of eros and lust. The good horse, meanwhile, "is obedient to the charioteer" and "still controlled ... by its sense of shame," and meant to steer the charioteer away from the shameful and towards the divine. Both horses are present in the life of the charioteer at every moment, and act in a very similar fashion to the shoulder angel and shoulder devil plot device.

Modern representations 

In several modern fictional stories, a character can be marked as especially evil or mischievous by receiving similarly bad advice from both shoulder figures, having a second shoulder devil instead of the angel, or being persuaded by the devil to kick the angel out.

One may view this image in Freudian terms, with the Angel representing the Super-ego (the source of self-censorship), counterbalanced by the Devil representing the Id (the primal, instinctive desires of the individual), which leaves the individual in question as the Ego.

In modern media 

Angel on My Shoulder is a 1946 American fantasy film about a deal between the Devil and a dead man.

The Adventures of Tintin comics used this concept in at least two stories. In the 1958 comic The Red Sea Sharks, Captain Haddock's good and bad angels try to convince him to drink a bottle of whisky.  The bad one is able to convince him, but the bottle smashes before he is able to drink it, leaving the good angel victorious. In the 1960 comic Tintin in Tibet, Snowy is tempted by his demon to lap up Captain Haddock's whiskey leaking from his rucksack. In an later instance from the same book, his demon tempts him to enjoy a huge bone rather than deliver a vital message. His good angel loses the argument, leaving in tears, and he gnaws the bone while the message blows away. Realizing his mistake, Snowy makes amends by reaching a local monastery and brings the monks to help.
In both examples, the angels resemble good or bad versions of their subject, with horns and angel wings.

In 1960, the original Hanna-Barbera cartoon, The Flintstones  season 1, episode 12, “The Sweepstakes Ticket,” features Fred Flintstone with an angel conscience on one shoulder and a devil conscience on the other. These characters look like Fred dressed up in angel/devil costume, and they encourage him to trust those around him or to behave dishonestly and greedily.

In 1993, in The Simpsons episode "Whacking Day," Homer presents the concept that everyone has a good and a bad self to Lisa. A fantasy sequence set in Homer's imagination then begins, showing Homer's bad self, visually depicted as Homer in a devil costume, dancing on the grave of the good Homer while singing 'I am Evil Homer, I am Evil Homer', implying that within him the battle for good and evil has long ago been won by his bad angel.

The trope is used in a 1996 Wendy's commercial for a spicy bacon cheeseburger. Founder Dave Thomas is indecisive about the new recipe, and his shoulder angel and devil are him dressed in a white and red suit respectively. Both character appear morally good, but with different personalities, as they are not meant to represent good and evil, but food preferences (with the "angel" representing mild food and the "devil" representing spice). The "devil" Dave wins the debate to add spicy pepper jack cheese to the burger, and the "angel" Dave suggests he be careful while eating the burger. The founder tells his angel to "mind his own business."

The Sluggy Freelance webcomic, beginning in 1997, has made use of this theme, with all three of the main characters: Riff, Torg and Zoe, who have been shown debating with their shoulder angels and demons.  Despite being good and bad they both still reflect aspects of their owner - both Riff's are unwilling to commit to a course of action saying 'don't know' when asked for guidance.  Torg's angel and demon are both childish while Zoe has her bad demon dressed in revealing outfit, while her good one wishes she could dress in the same fashion.

The 2000 Disney animated film The Emperor's New Groove, its sequel Kronk's New Groove, and the animated series The Emperor's New School feature the concept of shoulder angels and devils, most notably in the character of Kronk. His appear at various points of moral crisis in the franchise for Kronk, but often spend more time antagonizing each other than actually trying to take Kronk down one path or another. The Oscar-winning Disney short Lend a Paw also featured Pluto being influenced by a shoulder angel and devil. In Mickey Mouse Clubhouse, a Disney animated series aimed at preschoolers, Pete has similar manifestations—though simply colored white and red rather than depicted with wings and a halo/horns and a pitchfork, respectively.

In the 2002 Discworld novel Nightwatch by Terry Pratchett the killer Carcer was considered by the hero Samuel Vimes to have a demon on each shoulder rather than an angel and a demon, but not opposing each other, just in competition to urge Carcer on to worse deeds.  It was said that if Vimes looked deep into Carcer's eyes, he could see the demons looking back.

The 2012 film Cloud Atlas is an example of utilizing a shoulder angel plot device in feature film, in which the character played by Hugo Weaving whispers bad and good advice to the character played by Tom Hanks. Old Georgie (Hugo Weaving) appears only in critical points of the story, where Zachry's mind (Tom Hanks) is split between right and wrong choices.

BYUtv's sketch comedy series Studio C makes use of the concept in several sketches, with the physical comedy aspect of the angel or devil-a full-sized being played by an actor-having to physically climb up onto the shoulder of the one they are attempting to influence for good or evil.

See also

References

External links 
 Studio C Shoulder Angel at YouTube

Stock characters
Angels in popular culture
Demons in popular culture
Narrative techniques